Evergestis albifasciaria is a moth in the family Crambidae. It was described by Na Chen and Shuxia Wang in 2013. It is found in China (Gansu, Hebei, Inner Mongolia, Qinghai).

The wingspan is 22−28 mm. The forewings are greyish brown, scattered with blackish brown and white scales and diffused with blackish-brown scales basally. The markings are black. The hindwings are off white, suffused with black scales and darker towards termen.

Etymology
The species name refers to the broad white band that runs from the inner margin of the postmedial line to the tornus and is derived from Latin albus and fasciarium.

References

Evergestis
Moths described in 2013
Moths of Asia